The 1974–75 Phoenix Roadrunners season was the Phoenix Roadrunners first season of operation in the World Hockey Association (WHA). The Roadrunners qualified for the playoffs, losing in the first round to the Quebec Nordiques.

Offseason

Regular season

Final standings

Game log

Playoffs

Quebec Nordiques 4, Phoenix Roadrunners 1

Player stats

Note: Pos = Position; GP = Games played; G = Goals; A = Assists; Pts = Points; +/- = plus/minus; PIM = Penalty minutes; PPG = Power-play goals; SHG = Short-handed goals; GWG = Game-winning goals
      MIN = Minutes played; W = Wins; L = Losses; T = Ties; GA = Goals-against; GAA = Goals-against average; SO = Shutouts;

Awards and records

Transactions

Draft picks
Phoenix's draft picks at the 1974 WHA Amateur Draft.

Farm teams

See also
1974–75 WHA season

References

External links

Phoe
Phoe
Phoenix Roadrunners seasons